Ahmadabad-e Owfan (also Romanized as Aḩmadābād-e Owfān and Aḩmadābād-e Ūfān; also known as Aḩmadābād, Aḩmadābād-e Arfān, and Akhmedabad) is a village in Ilat-e Qaqazan-e Sharqi Rural District, Kuhin District, Qazvin County, Qazvin Province, Iran. At the 2006 census, its population was 128, in 29 families.

References 

Populated places in Qazvin County